Seventh Day Baptist Church may refer to:
 Seventh Day Baptist Church (DeRuyter, New York), listed in the National Register of Historic Places in Madison County, New York
 Seventh Day Baptist Church (Milton, Wisconsin), listed on the National Register of Historic Places in Rock County, Wisconsin
Seventh Day Baptist, a  Christian Baptists sect that observes seventh-day Sabbath